Ivan Kalmar (born February 13, 1948) is a Canadian professor.

Early life 
Soon after he was born in Prague, his family moved to Komárno, and later to Bratislava. When he was seventeen, he left what was then Czechoslovakia, and eventually arrived in the United States. Kalmar's family settled down in Philadelphia.

Education 
Kalmar attended The University of Pennsylvania. There he received his undergraduate degree. Moving to Toronto during the Vietnam War, he took up study at The University of Toronto, where he received both a master's degree and a PhD in anthropology.

Career 
Kalmar is currently a Professor of Anthropology at the University of Toronto. He is a faculty member of the Munk School of Global Affairs, and a fellow of Victoria College. In his recent research, the focus has been on western Christian views of Jews and Muslims. Currently, Kalmar is working on illiberalism and populism in the eastern, formerly communist-ruled areas of the European Union.

Selected bibliography

Some of the following texts are available online via the University of Toronto Library.

Books
 The Trotskys, Freuds, and Woody Allens: Portrait of a Culture. New York: Viking Press, 1994.
 Orientalism and the Jews. Ed. by Ivan Davidson Kalmar and Derek J. Penslar. Waltham, MA: Brandeis University Press, 2005.
 Early Orientalism: Imagined Islam and the Notion of Sublime Power. London and New York: Routledge, 2014. 

Journal articles and book chapters
 "The Origins of the `Spanish Synagogue' of Prague." Judaica Bohemiae 35 (1999): 158-209.
 "Moorish Style: Orientalism, the Jews, and Synagogue Architecture." Jewish Social Studies: History, Culture, and Society 7.3 (2001): 68-100. 
 "I Did Not Know You Were Jewish … and Other Things Not to Say When You Find Out." Pam Downe and Lesley Biggs eds., Women's & Gender Studies Reader. Black Point, NS: Fernwood, 2005.
 "The Future of `Tribal Man’ in the Electronic Age," Marshall McLuhan: Critical Evaluations in Cultural Theory. Ed. Gary Genosko. New York: Routledge, 2005.
 "Benjamin Disraeli: Romantic Orientalist." Comparative Studies in History and Society 47.2 (2005):348-371.
 "Antisemitism and Islamophobia: The Formation of a Secret," Human Architecture 7 (Spring 2009)
 "Is Islam Anti-Semitic?" Literary Review of Canada (March 2011)
 "Arabizing the Bible: Racial Supersessionism in Nineteenth Century Christian Art and Biblical Criticism" in Ian Netton, ed. Orientalism Revisited. London and New York: Routledge, 2012, 176-186.
 "Race by Grace:Race and Religion, the Secular State, and the Construction of ‘Jew’ and ‘Arab," in Efraim Sicher, Jews Color Race: Rethinking Jewish Identities. London: Berghahn Press, 2013, 482-509.
 “Islamophobia in Germany: East/West,” Special Issue of The Journal of Contemporary Studies, guest edited with Nitzan Shoshan.
 “Islamophobia in the East of the European Union,” Special Issue of Patterns of Prejudice (2018), guest editor.

References

Canadian anthropologists
Jewish Canadian writers
Canadian people of Czech-Jewish descent
Czechoslovak emigrants to Canada
Academic staff of the University of Toronto
Living people
1948 births
Linguists of Eskaleut languages